The Eastern Sudetes (or Jesenická oblast) are the eastern part of the Sudetes mountains on the border of the Czech Republic and Poland. They stretch from the Kłodzko Valley and the Eastern Neisse River in the west down to the Moravian Gate in the east, leading to the Outer Western Carpathians.

Subdivision
The Eastern Sudetes consist of geomorphological units:
 Golden Mountains
 Śnieżnik Mountains
 Opawskie Mountains / Zlatohorská Highlands
 Hrubý Jeseník (also known as High Ash Mountains)
 Hanušovice Highlands
 Mohelnice Depression
 Zábřeh Highlands
 Nízký Jeseník

Notable towns
Notable towns in this area include:
 Prudnik (Poland)
 Głuchołazy (Poland)
 Jeseník (Czech Republic)
 Bruntál (Czech Republic)
 Krnov (Czech Republic)
 Šumperk (Czech Republic)
 Zábřeh (Czech Republic)

References

Sudetes
Mountain ranges of Poland
Mountain ranges of the Czech Republic